The 2019–20 Sydney Uni Flames season is the 40th season for the franchise in the Women's National Basketball League (WNBL).

Brydens Lawyers remain as the Flames' naming rights sponsor for the seventh consecutive season.

Roster

Standings

Results

Pre-season

Regular season

Awards

In-season

Post-season

Club Awards

References

External links
Sydney Uni Flames Official website

2019–20 WNBL season
WNBL seasons by team
2019–20 in Australian basketball
Basketball,Sydney Uni Flames
Basketball,Sydney Uni Flames